Main City is an unincorporated community in Cass County, in the U.S. state of Missouri.

History
Main City was platted in 1879, and named in honor of William Main, local landowner.  A post office called Main City was established in 1879, and remained in operation until 1906.

References

Unincorporated communities in Cass County, Missouri
Unincorporated communities in Missouri